I Want to Live with Letizia (Italian: Voglio vivere con Letizia) is a 1938 Italian "white-telephones" comedy film directed by Camillo Mastrocinque and starring Assia Noris, Gino Cervi and Umberto Melnati.

It was shot at Cinecittà Studios in Rome. The film's sets were designed by the art directors Guido Fiorini and Gastone Medin.

Synopsis
In order to please his wealthy parents Bebe agrees to an arranged marriage with Letizia, the daughter of an aristocratic family who have fallen on hard times. However, in order to check that she is not marrying him for his money alone, he sends his cousin to take his place while he pretends to be a penniless painter. He is able to discover that she truly can fall in love with him.

Cast
 Assia Noris as Letizia
 Gino Cervi as Bebe
 Umberto Melnati as Il finto Bebe
 Bianca Stagno Bellincioni as La signora Barozzi
 Clara Padoa as La contessa Serravalle
 Enzo Biliotti as Osvaldo Tempera
 Marisa Vernati as Kiki
 Guglielmo Barnabò as Il signor Barozzi
 Pina De Angelis as Un'amica di Letizia
 Norma Nova as Stefania
 Aristide Baghetti as L'avvocato
 Tullia Baghetti as La suora
 Amalia Pellegrini as La governante

References

Bibliography 
 Chiti, Roberto & Poppi, Roberto . I film: Tutti i film italiani dal 1930 al 1944. Gremese Editore, 2005.

External links 
 

1938 films
Italian comedy films
1938 comedy films
1930s Italian-language films
Films directed by Camillo Mastrocinque
Italian black-and-white films
Films shot at Cinecittà Studios
1930s Italian films